"Hold That Heat" is a song by American record producer Southside and American rapper Future featuring fellow American rapper Travis Scott. It was released on April 22, 2022 with an accompanying music video. The song was written by the artists alongside Mike Dean, who produced it with Southside.

Background
Southside and Travis Scott created the song about eight months before it was released. Months later, Scott recruited Future on the track.

"Hold That Heat" is the first song that Scott has released since the Astroworld Festival crowd crush in November 2021.

Composition
The song features a trap beat. Both rappers perform the hook in a repetitive style as well as "lengthy verses". Scott performs the opening verse, celebrating his success as a rapper, while Future sings the closing verse.

Music video
The music video was directed by Philip Andelman. It opens with Southside smoking marijuana and staring at himself in a mirror, and takes place in a dark motel filled with flashing lasers. Travis Scott walks a domesticated crocodile with a chain leash as he raps, while Future performs his verse in a red room. The rappers are accompanied by a stripper dancing on a pole.

Charts

References

2022 singles
2022 songs
Future (rapper) songs
Travis Scott songs
Song recordings produced by Southside (record producer)
Song recordings produced by Mike Dean (record producer)
Songs written by Southside (record producer)
Songs written by Future (rapper)
Songs written by Travis Scott
Songs written by Mike Dean (record producer)
Epic Records singles
Music videos directed by Philip Andelman